Mirosław Formela (born 31 October 1978 in Lębork) is a retired Polish middle distance runner. He finished 5th in the 1500 metres at the 2004 World Indoor Championships.

Achievements

Personal bests
Outdoor
 800 metres – 1:46.26 (Warsaw 2006)
 1000 metres – 2:21.40 (Sondershausen 2002)
 1500 metres – 3:38.60 (Lausanne 2004)

Indoor
 800 metres – 1:47.76 (Spała 2004)
 1000 metres – 2:21.51 (Fayetteville 2005)
 1500 metres – 3:39.88 (Spała 2005)

References
 

1978 births
Living people
Polish male middle-distance runners
People from Lębork
Sportspeople from Pomeranian Voivodeship
21st-century Polish people